Year 1308 (MCCCVIII) was a leap year starting on Monday (link will display the full calendar) of the Julian calendar.

Events 
 
 By place  

 Europe 
 November 13 – The Teutonic Knights capture Gdańsk by treachery – while a Brandenburger force of 100 knights and 200 followers led by Heinrich von Plötzke and Günther von Schwarzburg, disputed king of Germany, lay siege to the city. The garrison of Gdańsk castle is too weak to defend itself against the Brandenburgers. Meanwhile, Władysław I Łokietek (Elbow-High), Polish ruler of Gdańsk Pomerania, is unable to send reinforcements. The citizens call upon the Teutonic Knights for military help and offer to pay their costs. The arrival of the knights, lead the Brandenburgers to beat a hasty retreat. In an act of supreme treachery, the Teutonic Knights attack the city they have come to save. The houses of both Polish and German are burnt and destroyed. Many people are slaughtered without mercy, including women and children who have sought sanctuary in churches. Within a year, the German Crusaders occupy the whole of Eastern Pomerania and consolidate their power at the Baltic Sea.
 November 27
 Henry VII, count of Luxemburg, is elected new emperor of the Holy Roman Empire at Frankfurt. Due to the support of his brother Baldwin, archbishop of Trier – who wins over most of the electors, in exchange for some substantial concessions. The only elector who does not support him is Henry of Bohemia.
 Hungarian nobles elect the 20-year-old Charles Robert as king of Hungary and Croatia in Pest. He becomes Charles I, but his rule remains nominal in most parts of the realm after he is crowned. 
 December – Władysław I Łokietek (Elbow-High) imprisons Jan Muskata, bishop of Kraków. In response, Polish and German citizens revolted against his rule in Kraków (as in all Poland's cities at this time). Władysław in a delicate position responds with force and arrests the revolt's leaders. He ties them to horses and drags them through the city streets.
 December 19 – Treaty of Alcalá de Henares: King Ferdinand IV (the summoned) and James II (the Just) sign an alliance in the Monastery of Santa María de Huerta. Ferdinand agrees to join James in making war by sea and by land against Granada. He also promises to give up one-sixth of Granada to Aragon, and grants him the Province of Almería. 
 Sultan Mesud II, Seljuk vassal of the Mongol Ilkhanate, is murdered after a 5-year reign. During his rule, he exercises no real authority and becomes the last ruler. Ending the Sultanate of Rum after 230 years.
 King Philip IV (the Fair) purchases Hôtel de Nesle in Paris and builds one of the earliest indoor tennis courts there. 

 England 
 January 25 – King Edward II marries the 13-year-old Isabella of France, daughter of King Philip IV (the Fair). The marriage takes place at Boulogne and Edward leaves his friend and favourite, Piers Gaveston, as regent in his absence. Isabella's wardrobe indicates her wealth and style – she has dresses of silk, velvet, taffeta and cloth along with numerous furs; she has over 72 headdresses and coifs. Isabella brings with her two gold crowns, gold and silver dinnerware and 419 yards of linen. Meanwhile, Edward alienates the nobles by placing Gaveston in such a powerful position, who react by signing the Boulogne agreement on January 31.Castor, Helen (2011). She-Wolves: The Woman Who Ruled England Before Elizabeth, p. 227. Faber and Faber. .
 February 25 – Edward II is crowned at Westminster Abbey under the guidance of Henry Woodlock, bishop of Winchester. During the ceremony, Piers Gaveston is given the honour of carrying the crown. At the banquet that followed, Edward spends more time with Gaveston than with his wife Isabella of France. Isabella's family, who have travelled with her from France, leave to report back to Philip IV of Edward's favouritism for Gaveston over Isabella. As part of the coronation, Edward swears an oath to uphold "the rightful laws and customs which the community of the realm shall have chosen".Philips, Seymour (2011). Edward II, pp. 140–141. New Haven, CT & London. UK: Yale University Press. .
 May 23 – Battle of Inverurie: Scottish forces led by King Robert I (the Bruce) defeat the rival Scots under John Comyn at Oldmeldrum. During the battle, Robert repulses a surprise attack on his camp, and counter-attacks the Scots of Clan Cumming (or Comyn). John flees to seek refuge at the English court and is well-received by Edward II, who appoints him as Lord Warden of the Marches. Meanwhile, Robert orders his forces to burn the farms, houses and strongholds associated with Clan Cumming in north-east Scotland. The Earldom of Buchan will never again rise for Clan Cumming.
 June 25 – Piers Gaveston is exiled for the second time by the Parliament, due to possible corruption and exploited personal gains. As compensation for the loss of the Earldom of Cornwall, which is another condition of his exile, Gaveston is granted land worth 3,000 marks annually in Gascony. Further to this, he is appointed Lord Lieutenant of Ireland – so that a certain amount of honour can be maintained despite the humiliation of the exile. Gaveston is also threatened with ex-communication by Pope Clement V. Edward II accompanies him to Bristol, from where he sets sail for Ireland.Hamilton, J. S. (1988). Piers Gaveston, Earl of Cornwall, 1307–1312: Politics and Patronage in the Reign of Edward II, p. 53. Detroit; London: Wayne State University Press. .
 Summer – Battle of the Pass of Brander: Scottish forces under King Robert I (the Bruce) defeat the rival Scots of the Clan MacDougall, kinsmen of John Comyn III (the Red). During the battle, Robert orders to bypass the Pass of Brander. He sends James Douglas (the Black) with a party of archers to take up positions above the pass to avoid an ambush. Robert breaks through the MacDougalls blockade and defeats them at the Bridge of Awe. The MacDougalls are chased westwards across the River Awe to Dunstaffnage. The Lord of Argyll surrenders and does homage to Robert.Fordun, John of, Chronicles of the Scottish Nation, ed. W. F. Skene, 1972.
 The Harrying of Buchan (also known as the Herschip), Scottish forces under Edward Bruce devastate the lands of John Comyn, and his supporters following the victory at Inverurie. Meanwhile, Robert I (the Bruce) takes Aberdeen, conquers Galloway and threatens northern Scotland.

 Africa 
 April 15 – Abu Hammu I ascend to the throne of the Kingdom of Tlemcen after the death of his brother, Sultan Abu Zayyan I.
 July 28 – Abu Thabit 'Amir dies and is succeeded by his brother Abu al-Rabi Sulayman as ruler of the Marinid Sultanate.

 Asia 
 Summer – Delhi forces led by Malik Kafur invade the Yadava Kingdom under King Ramachandra, who shelters the fugitive Vaghela king Karna. Ramachandra sues for peace and acknowledges Delhi's overlordship. 
 September – Siege of Siwana: Delhi forces under Alauddin Khalji capture the Siwana fortress after a two-month siege. During the siege, Alauddin defiles the main water tank of Siwana (by a traitor) with cows' blood.
 September 10 – Emperor Go-Nijō (or Nijō II) dies of an illness after a 7-year reign. He is succeeded by his 11-year-old cousin, Hanazono, as the 95th emperor of Japan (until 1348).

By topic

Cities and Towns 
 March 8 – King Denis I (the Poet King) grants Póvoa de Varzim a charter, the Foral, giving royal lands to 54 families, who found a municipality known as Póvoa around Praça Velha.

Literature 
 Dante Alighieri begins work on his Divine Comedy, comprising Inferno, Purgatorio and Paradiso. It is one of the most influential works of the European Middle Ages (approximate date).  
</onlyinclude>

Births 
 August 12 – Moriyoshi, Japanese nobleman and prince (d. 1335)
 Andrea Orcagna, Italian painter, sculptor and architect (d. 1368)
 Gaston II, French nobleman and knight (House of Foix) (d. 1343)
 Joan III of Burgundy, French noblewoman and princess (d. 1347)
 Joguk (or Borjigin Jintong), queen consort of Goryeo (d. 1325)
 Longchenpa, Tibetan Buddhist scholar-yogi and writer (d. 1364)

Deaths 
 January 30 – Margaret of Tyre, Outremer noblewoman (b. 1244)
 February 1 – Herman I (the Tall), German nobleman (b. 1275)
 March 18 – Yuri I of Galicia, king of Ruthenia (House of Rurik) 
 April 5 
 Ivan Kőszegi, Hungarian nobleman and palatine (b. 1245)
 Reginald de Grey, English nobleman and knight (b. 1240)
 May 1 – Albert I, German nobleman, pretender and king (b. 1255)
 May 22 – Amadeus II, Burgundian nobleman (House of Geneva)
 July 4 – Eberhard I, German nobleman (House of La Marck)
 July 28 – Abu Thabit 'Amir, Marinid ruler of Morocco (b. 1284)
 July 30 – Chungnyeol, Korean ruler (House of Wang) (b. 1236)
 August 12 – Edmund Stafford, English nobleman and Peerage
 August 18 – Clare of Montefalco, Italian nun and abbess (b. 1268)
 September 4 – Margaret of Burgundy, queen of Sicily (b. 1250)
 September 10 – Go-Nijō (or Nijō II), Japanese emperor (b. 1285)
 October 5 – Guy II, Latin nobleman (House de la Roche) (b. 1280) 
 October 10 – Patrick IV (de Dunbar), Scottish nobleman (b. 1242)
 November 8 – John Duns Scotus, Scottish priest and philosopher 
 December 16 – Tran Nhan Tong, Vietnamese emperor (b. 1258)
 December 21 – Henry I (the Child), German nobleman  (b. 1244)

References